Ryze is a social networking service designed to link business professionals, particularly new entrepreneurs. The site claims to have over 1,000,000 members in 200 countries, with over 1,000 external organizations hosting sub-networks on the site. Founded in early 2001 by Adrian Scott, it was one of the first of a new generation of social networking services and was a heavy influence on Friendster, founded by early Ryze member, Jonathan Abrams, in 2003. Ken Berger was the first external member of Ryze, joining in June 2001.

Press
The site has been mentioned in publications including Forbes, Newsday, The New York Times, The Boston Globe, USA Today and others.

References

External links
 

American social networking websites
Internet properties established in 2001
Professional networks